Shtylla is a surname. Notable people with the surname include:

 Behar Shtylla (1918–1994), Albanian diplomat
 Medar Shtylla (1907–1963), Albanian politician